Nikifor Romanovich Chernigovsky (died in 1675; Polish: Nicefor Czernichowski, also known as Jaxa-Czernichowski and Czernihowski, Russian: Никифор Романович Черниговский) was a Polish noble who was exiled to Siberia over the course of the Polish-Russian war. In 1665, he murdered the voivode of Ilimsk for raping his daughter, and fled to the Amur where he reoccupied the ruins of Albazin and gathered a band of supporters forming the state of Jaxa.

Life
Nicefor Czernichowski became a Russian prisoner in 1633 during the battle near Novhorod-Siverskyi (most likely together with his father, Roman); his name was mentioned in the Russian chronicle Razriad. In August 1633 he was exiled to Vologda. Due to a peace treaty ending the Polish-Russian war in 1634 he was entitled to be liberated. As he married a woman from Moscow, he initially intended to stay in Muscovy; he swore loyalty to the Tsar and in 1635 he converted to Orthodoxy.
 
He later changed his mind and in the company of 7 companions, he headed towards the Polish border. He may or may not been aware that he was no longer entitled to return to his homeland, at least in the eyes of the Tsar. On 3 July 1636, he was captured and exiled to Yeniseysk, arriving in 1637 and accompanied by his wife. In 1649, he was sent further east to Ilimsk, then to Ust-Kut and Kirensk. He went on to have three sons and two daughters during this time. In 1656 he became leader of the cossacks. His address to Tsar to restore his noble status was left unanswered in 1657.

In 1664, the voivode of Ilimsk, Lawrentij Obuhov, raped his daughter, Pelagia, who was the wife of Foma Kirylow. In an act of revenge, Nicefor murdered Obuhov in 1665. Nicefor subsequently was outlawed; he organized a group of 84 cossacks, including the orthodox monk Hermogenes, and traveled towards the Amur river bordering China, where he settled at the ruins of Albazin.

State of Jaxa

Nicefor founded a petty kingdom among the local Daur people. His new domain stretched down the river to the mouth of the Zeya River, 500 km from Albazin. The state was called Jaxa – derived from Nicefor's coat of arms. Monk Hermogenes wrote down the Code of Law.

From the beginning, Nicefor's international position was peculiar – his state was not recognized by Russia nor China. The state consisted of only 500 people. After initial struggles with Russia, he unilaterally recognized the overlordship of the Tsar in 1669. In 1670 he defended his state against a Chinese expedition. In 1672 the Tsar issued a death sentence against Nicefor that was followed by an act of mercy two days later. In 1674, Nicefor Czernichowski was nominated for the position of voivod in charge of Albazin. In 1675, he was called by the Daur people that had been resettled in Manchuria by the Chinese and wanted to return to join the state of Jaxa again. Most likely, he died during the expedition to Manchuria.

This Jaxa state was internationally recognized and was visited by diplomats of France and the Netherlands, like Nicolaes Witsen.

External links
 
  Nikifor Romanov Chernigovsky

References

1670s deaths
Year of birth unknown
17th-century Polish nobility
People from Zhytomyr Oblast
People from Kiev Voivodeship
Converts to Eastern Orthodoxy from Catholicism
Polish exiles in the Russian Empire
National founders
Outlaws